The Oakland Athletics' 1984 season involved the A's finishing 4th in the American League West with a record of 77 wins and 85 losses. While the A's struggled for a third consecutive season, they staged a major coup by drafting future superstar Mark McGwire with the tenth overall pick of the 1984 Major League Baseball Draft. The season also marked the end of Rickey Henderson's first (of four) stints with the Athletics. His second stint would begin in 1989.

Offseason 
 October 28, 1983: Joe Rudi was released by the Athletics.
 November 21, 1983: Dave Beard and Bob Kearney were traded by the Athletics to the Seattle Mariners for Bill Caudill and Darrel Akerfelds.
 December 13, 1983: Joe Morgan was signed as a free agent by the Athletics.
 December 7, 1983: Rusty McNealy and cash were traded by the Athletics to the Montreal Expos for Ray Burris.
 January 3, 1984: Luis Polonia was signed by the Athletics as an amateur free agent.
 January 3, 1984: Félix José was signed by the Athletics as an amateur free agent.
 January 16, 1984: Jack Daugherty was released by the Athletics.
 February 8, 1984: Tim Belcher was chosen by the Athletics from the New York Yankees as a free agent compensation pick.

Regular season 
 August 19, 1984: In a game against the Athletics, Cliff Johnson of the Toronto Blue Jays hit the 19th pinch home run of his career, breaking Jerry Lynch's mark of 18.

Season standings

Record vs. opponents

Notable transactions 
 June 4, 1984: 1984 Major League Baseball Draft
Mark McGwire was drafted by the Athletics in the 1st round (10th pick). Player signed July 20, 1984.
Todd Burns was drafted by the Athletics in the 7th round.
 June 9, 1984: Chuck Hensley was purchased by the Milwaukee Brewers from the Oakland Athletics.
 July 3, 1984: Mike Torrez was signed as a free agent by the Athletics.
 August 9, 1984: Mike Torrez was released by the Athletics.

Roster

Player stats

Batting

Starters by position 
Note: Pos = Position; G = Games played; AB = At bats; H = Hits; Avg. = Batting average; HR = Home runs; RBI = Runs batted in

Other batters 
Note: G = Games played; AB = At bats; H = Hits; Avg. = Batting average; HR = Home runs; RBI = Runs batted in

Pitching

Starting pitchers 
Note: G = Games pitched; IP = Innings pitched; W = Wins; L = Losses; ERA = Earned run average; SO = Strikeouts

Other pitchers 
Note: G = Games pitched; IP = Innings pitched; W = Wins; L = Losses; ERA = Earned run average; SO = Strikeouts

Relief pitchers 
Note: G = Games pitched; W = Wins; L = Losses; SV = Saves; ERA = Earned run average; SO = Strikeouts

Farm system 

LEAGUE CHAMPIONS: Modesto

References

External links
1984 Oakland Athletics team page at Baseball Reference
1984 Oakland Athletics team page at www.baseball-almanac.com

Oakland Athletics seasons
Oakland Athletics season
Oakland Athletics